Anke Huber was the defending champion, but lost in quarterfinals to Gala León García.

Cristina Torrens Valero won the title by defeating Gala León García 6–2, 6–2 in the final.

Seeds
The first two seeds received a bye into the second round.

Draw

Finals

Top half

Bottom half

References
 Official Results Archive (ITF)
 Official Results Archive (WTA)

Women's Singles
Singles